Richard Johnston McIlwaine (born 16 March 1950) is a former English first-class cricketer who was a right-handed batsman and bowled medium pace. McIlwaine was primarily used as a bowler.

McIlwaine made his first-class debut for Hampshire in the 1969 County Championship against Northamptonshire. That season McIlwaine played one more championship match against Surrey.

McIlwaine also played two championship matches in 1970, the first of which was against local rivals Sussex. His final first-class match came in the same season against Glamorgan at the United Services Recreation Ground in his home city of Portsmouth. At the end of the 1970 season McIlwaine left Hampshire.

External links
Richard McIlwaine at Cricinfo
Richard McIlwaine at CricketArchive

1950 births
Living people
Cricketers from Portsmouth
English cricketers
Hampshire cricketers